Anthony J. Drexel is a bronze statue by Moses Jacob Ezekiel of Drexel University founder Anthony Joseph Drexel.
It is located at 32nd Street and Market Street, Philadelphia.

It was dedicated on June 17, 1905, at Belmont and Lansdowne Avenues. 
It was relocated to Drexel University, in December 1966, and again in 2003.

The inscription reads:
(Sculpture, proper right front, on oriental carpet near base:)

(Base, front:) 

(Base, left side:) 
FOUNDER OF THE DREXEL
1826 1893 
(Base, rear:) 
INSTITUTE OF ART
PRESENTED TO THE CITIZENS
OF PHILADELPHIA BY HIS FRIEND JOHN H. HARJES
1904
(Base, right side:) 
SCIENCE AND INDUSTRY
1826 1893 signed

See also
 List of public art in Philadelphia

References

External links
http://www.philart.net/artist.php?id=197

Outdoor sculptures in Philadelphia
1904 sculptures
Bronze sculptures in Pennsylvania
Drexel University
University City, Philadelphia
Statues in Pennsylvania
Sculptures of men in Pennsylvania
1904 establishments in Pennsylvania
Sculptures of Moses Jacob Ezekiel